The Women's 25 km competition of the 2022 European Aquatics Championships were held on 20 August.

Swimmers were halted partway through the competition due to extreme weather and the event canceled. In November of the same year, LEN awarded medals and final rankings.

Results
The race was started at 13:00.

References

2022 European Aquatics Championships